Nanno de Groot (March 23, 1913 – December 26, 1963) was a self-taught artist. He belonged to the group of New York School Abstract expressionist artists of the 1950s. He wrote:

In moments of clarity of thought I can sustain the idea that everything on earth is nature, including that which springs forth from a man's mind, and hand. A Franz Kline is nature as much as a zinnia.

Biography

Nanno de Groot was born March 23, 1913, in Balkbrug, Netherlands. 
In 1930–1933 he went to the nautical school in Amsterdam, Netherlands. After graduation he received third mate and radio operator's papers. From 1937 to 1941 he worked in the shipping business and lived on the island of Bali. In 1941 he was called for submarine duty by the Dutch Navy and was assigned to Admiral's headquarters on Java where he stayed until the arrival of the Japanese. He was then sent to San Francisco, California USA to serve as liaison officer to the US Army and US Navy in charge of running troop ships between the west coast and the western Pacific, chartered by the United States. He was Lieutenant Commander in charge of the Dutch Port Authority in San Francisco. The position discontinued in 1946. He applied for US citizenship. He became a US citizen in 1954.

Artistic career
Nanno de Groot started drawing at six years of age. His father prevented him to study art at the early age. In 1946 at age 33 he discovered Picasso and he dedicated the rest of his life to painting and drawing. He worked for a year as a cartoonist for the San Francisco Chronicle. After his marriage to the New York School artist Elise Asher in 1948 de Groot settled in New York on West 12th Street. He and Elise Asher divorced in 1957, and she subsequently married poet Stanley Kunitz.

Nanno de Groot became connected to the pioneers of the New York School. De Groot considered himself an American artist and part of the abstract expressionist movement. He participated from 1954 to 1957 in the invitational New York Painting and Sculpture Annuals These Annuals were important because the participants were chosen by the artists themselves.

Nanno de Groot died on December 26, 1963, in Provincetown, Massachusetts, from lung cancer.

Selected solo exhibitions
1952 : Saidenberg Gallery, New York;
1954, 55: Bertha Schaefer Gallery, NYC;
1956, 59, 60, 61, 64 (memorial): HCE Gallery, Provincetown, Massachusetts;
1957, 58, 59, 61: Parma Gallery,  NY;
1960: October, Stamford Museum & Nature Center, Stamford, Connecticut;
1971: Jack Gregory Gallery, Provincetown, Massachusetts;
1982: Provincetown Art Association and Museum, Provincetown, Massachusetts;
1987–2003: Julie Heller Gallery, Provincetown, MA.
2007: NANNO de GROOT: EARTH, SEA & SKY at ACME Fine Art, Boston, Massachusetts

Selected group exhibitions
1953 Saidenberg Gallery, NYC;
1953 Hansa Gallery, NYC;
1954, 55: Tanager Gallery, NYC;
1954, 55, 56, 57: Ncw York Painting and Sculpture Annuals at the Stable Gallery, NYC;
1962, 63: HCE Provincetown, Massachusetts;
1953–1964: Provincetown Art Association and Museum, Provincetown, Massachusetts
1982: Everson Museum "Provincetown Painters" principal collections;
1994: "Reclaiming Artists of the New York School. Toward a More Inclusive View of the 1950s," Baruch College, City University, NY; "New York-Provincetown: A 50's Connection," Provincetown Art Association and Museum, Provincetown, Massachusetts; Anita Shapolsky Gallery, NYC;
1987–2003: Julie Heller Gallery, Provincetown, Massachusetts.

Works in museums and public collections
Hirshhorn Museum and Sculpture Garden, Washington D.C.
Museum of Fine Arts, Boston, Massachusetts
Chrysler Museum of Art, Provincetown, Massachusetts
Hebrew University, Jerusalem, Israel
Provincetown Art Association and Museum, Provincetown, Massachusetts
Olsen Foundation, Guilford, Connecticut
Kresge Art Museum, Michigan State University, East Lansing, Michigan

See also

New York School
Action painting
Abstract expressionism
Expressionism
American Figurative Expressionism

References

 Abstract expressionist art movement in America video documentation project, 1991–1992.
 Smithsonian Institution Research Information System; Archival, Manuscript and Photographs Catalog, Nanno de Groot

Catalogs which include Nanno de Groot
 Nanno De Groot : 1913–1963, the New York years : 9 September-9 October 2004 (oston : Acme Fine Art and Design, 2004.)
 Nanno de Groot : a retrospective exhibition, May 28 – June 30, 1982 (Provincetown : Provincetown Art Association & Museum, ©1982)
 Paintings and Sculpture (Tanager Gallery New York, 1956)
 Linda Lindeberg, Nanno de Groot : Bertha Schaefer (New York : The Gallery, [1951])
 Rockford Art Museum Reuniting an Era abstract expressionists of the 1950s Rockford Art Museum, Rockford, Illinois November 12, 2004 – January 25, 2005

Books
 Marika Herskovic, American Abstract and Figurative Expressionism: Style Is Timely Art Is Timeless (New York School Press, 2009.) . pp. 68–71
 Marika Herskovic, American Abstract Expressionism of the 1950s An Illustrated Survey, (New York School Press, 2003.) . pp. 86–89
 Marika Herskovic, New York School Abstract Expressionists Artists Choice by Artists, (New York School Press, 2000.) . p.  p. 31; p. 36;

External links
 Nanno de Groot on artnet
  14:51 min.
 NANNO de GROOT: EARTH, SEA & SKY at ACME Fine Art, Boston

1913 births
1963 deaths
Abstract expressionist artists
De Groot, Nanno
De Groot, Nanno
Royal Netherlands Navy officers
Royal Netherlands Navy personnel of World War II
Dutch painters
Dutch male painters
Expressionist painters
Dutch emigrants to the United States
People from Avereest
De Groot, Nanno
20th-century American male artists